The St Mary's Sanctuary Buoho Grotto is one of the Christian Pilgrimage for Catholics in Ghana located at Buoho in the Afigya-Kwabre District of the Ashanti Region of Ghana

History
The Sanctuary was completed within a period of eight months and dedicated on 12 November 1949.

References

Grottoes